The 2019–20 Odisha FC season was the club's inaugural season since its establishment in August 2019. On 31 August 2019, Delhi Soccer Private Limited signed a Memorandum of Understanding (MoU) with the Government of Odisha, to re-brand Delhi Dynamos FC as Odisha FC and shift the home base from the national capital New Delhi to Bhubaneswar, Odisha. The new home for the team was decided to be the Kalinga Stadium at Bhubaneswar.

Players

Competitions

Indian Super League

League table

Results (Matchday)

Fixtures
League stage

Personnel

Statistics

|-
! colspan=12 style="background:#1f1d4a; color:#FF0000; text-align:center| Goalkeepers

|-
! colspan=12 style="background:#1f1d4a; color:#FF0000; text-align:center| Defenders
|-

|-
! colspan=12 style="background:#1f1d4a; color:#FF0000; text-align:center| Midfielders
|-

 

 

|-
! colspan=12 style="background:#1f1d4a; color:#FF0000; text-align:center| Forwards
|-

  
|-

Updated: 14 March 2020

Top scorers

Source: ISL
Updated: 14 March 2020

Clean sheets

Source: ISL
Updated: 14 March 2020

Disciplinary record

Source: ISL
Updated: 14 March 2020

Awards

Hero of the Match

ISL Emerging Player of the Match

References

Odisha